Bruce Ferrari (born 13 July 1936) is  a former Australian rules footballer who played with Geelong in the Victorian Football League (VFL).

Notes

External links 
		

Living people
1936 births
Australian rules footballers from Victoria (Australia)
Geelong Football Club players
Shepparton United Football Club players